When Women Had Tails is a 1970 Italian comedy film set in pre-historic times when “women had tails” and were hunted by cavemen. It stars Giuliano Gemma, Senta Berger, and Lando Buzzanca. It was followed by When Women Lost Their Tails.

Plot
Seven orphan cavemen grow up on a little island all by themselves. After a fire burns all the vegetation, they set out to find a new place to live. One day they trap a strange animal, looking very similar to them, only softer and with longer hair.

She, Filli (Senta Berger), is attracted to one of the brothers, Ulli (Giuliano Gemma), and convinces him that a certain kind of playing with each other is far more satisfying than just eating her.

Cast
 Senta Berger: Filli
 Giuliano Gemma: Ulli
 Lando Buzzanca: Kao
 Frank Wolff: Grr
 Renzo Montagnani: Maluc
 Lino Toffolo: Put
 Francesco Mulé: Uto
 Aldo Giuffrè: Zog
 Paola Borboni: leader of the tribe of cave women

Home video release
It was released on VHS by Simitar Entertainment.

Oct. 9, 2020 Update: It was released on DVD in 2003 by Miracle Pictures a Division of PMC Corp. 
(And a October 9th 2020 internet search of "When Women Lost Their Tails (DVD 2003)" shows at least 2 different DVD cover art versions & one combination 2 movies on 1 DVD with "Blitz" as the second movie.)

References

External links

 

1970 films
1970 comedy films
Films directed by Pasquale Festa Campanile
Films scored by Ennio Morricone
Films about cavemen
Films set on islands
Italian comedy films
1970s Italian films